Kings is a 2017 English-language drama film written and directed by Deniz Gamze Ergüven. The film stars Halle Berry and Daniel Craig.

The film had its world premiere at the 2017 Toronto International Film Festival on September 13, 2017. The film was screened during three days as part of Stockholm's International Film Festival held in November 2017. The film was screened at the Torino Film Festival in Italy before opening wide by Spring 2018.

Plot 
Millie Dunbar is a single mother with eight adopted children in South Los Angeles. Her neighbour, Obie, is the only white man in the neighborhood. Together they form an unlikely team during the Rodney King riots.

Cast 
 Halle Berry as Millie Dunbar
 Daniel Craig as Obie Hardison
 Lamar Johnson as Jesse Cooper
 Kaalan 'KR' Walker as William McGee
 Rachel Hilson as Nicole Patterson
 Issac Ryan Brown as Shawnte
 Callan Farris as Ruben
 Serenity Reign Brown as Peaches
 Reece Cody as Tiger
 Gary Yavuz Perreau as Carter
 Aiden Akpan as Jordan
 Ce’Onna Johnson as Sherridanne
 Kirk Baltz and Peter Mackenzie as Police Officers
 Kevin Carroll as Manager
 Davis Pasquesi as Howard
Quartay Denaya played Latasha Harlins, while an uncredited Rick Ravanello played Officer Camello.

Production
Ergüven started working on the film when she graduated from La Fémis film school in 2006. It took her three years to write the script as she frequented South Los Angeles for research. In 2011, she was invited to the Cinéfondation workshop at the Cannes Film Festival, where she met Alice Winocour. After struggling to find producers and financiers for the project, she went on instead to write with Winocour and direct Mustang, which was released in 2015 and was nominated for the Academy Award for Best Foreign Language Film. The success of Mustang finally allowed her to make the film.

Principal photography began on December 27, 2016 in Los Angeles. Filming lasted until mid February 2017.

Reception
On review aggregator website Rotten Tomatoes, the film has an approval rating of 13% based on 38 reviews, and an average rating of 3.53/10. The website's critical consensus reads, "Kings has good intentions, a talented cast, and the basis for an incredible fact-based story; unfortunately, they don't amount to much more than a missed opportunity." On Metacritic, the film has a weighted average score of 34 out of 100, based on 16 critics, indicating "generally unfavorable reviews".

See also 
 List of hood films

References

External links 
 

2017 films
2017 romantic drama films
American romantic drama films
Drama films based on actual events
Films scored by Nick Cave
Films scored by Warren Ellis (musician)
Films set in 1992
Films set in Los Angeles
Films shot in Los Angeles
Hood films
Romance films based on actual events
2010s English-language films
2010s American films